Debt Recovery Tribunal is a quasi-judicial body formed under the Recovery of Debts Due to Banks and Financial Institutions (RDDBFI) Act, 1993 to facilitate recovery of loans by banks and financial institutions to the customers. Orders of the Debt Recovery Tribunal are appealable before the Debts Recovery Appellate Tribunal. Government of India selects the presiding officer in the Tribunal. The Tribunal is based on Debt Recovery Tribunals Act for a debt which is more than Rs 20,00,000. The Jurisdiction extends to whole of India except to the state of Jammu and Kashmir.

History and objective 

Debts Recovery Tribunals (DRTs) were formed under Banks and Financial Institutions (RDDBFI) Act, 1993  to facilitate debt recoveries by  banks and financial institutions and to design effective mechanism to recover their dues speedily without being subjected lengthy process of civil courts.

The objective of Debt Recovery Tribunal  is to ensure recovery of borrowed money from debtors which are due to banks and various financial institutions. Their role is limited to settling the claims and ensure the balance amount related to non-performing assets as categorised by the banks as per the provisions of  RBI guidelines are recovered.

Powers 

Debt Recovery Tribunal has powers of District Court for any claims before it relating to recovery of Debts. The Recovery officer in the tribunal is responsible to execute the recovery orders sanctioned by the Presiding Officers. DRT is bound to follow the legal procedure by laying emphasis on quick disposal of the cases and efficient and effective disposal of orders.

Composition 

Debt Recovery Tribunal consists of Presiding and Recovery officers.

Application 

Debt Recovery Tribunal is applicable for below cases 

The Debt Recovery Tribunal Act is applicable in entire India except the state of Jammu and Kashmir.

The act is applicable for due amount above Rs. 20, 00,000.

The act is also applicable even if the  preliminary application for  Debts recovery had been filed only by Banks and the Financial Institutions.

Places 

Debt recovery tribunals are set up in 39 places and The debt recovery appellate tribunals are based in 5 places, in India, they are; Mumbai, Delhi,Kolkata, Allahabad, and Chennai .

Challenges 

Debt Recovery Tribunal faces understaffing challenges with most positions not being filled up in time.

Related articles 

 Tribunals in India.

References

External links 
 Official Website

Government agencies of India
Indian Tribunals